The Sonnino I government of Italy held office from 8 February 1906 until 29 May 1906, a total of 110 days, or 3 months and 21 days.

Government parties
The government was composed by the following parties:

Composition

References

Italian governments
1906 establishments in Italy